A dog sled or dog sleigh is a sled pulled by one or more sled dogs used to travel over ice and through snow. Numerous types of sleds are used, depending on their function. They can be used for dog sled racing. Traditionally in Greenland and the eastern Canadian Arctic the Inuit had the dogs pull in a fan shape in front of the sled, while in other regions, such as Alaska and the western part of Northern Canada the dogs pull side by side in pairs.

History

Dog power has been used for hunting and traveling for over a thousand years. As far back as the 10th century BCE these dogs have contributed to human culture.

Assembling a dog sled team involves picking lead dogs, point dogs, swing dogs, and wheel dogs. The lead dog is crucial, so mushers take particular care of these dogs. Another important detail is to have powerful wheel dogs to pull the sled out from the snow. Point dogs (optional) are located behind the leader dogs, swing dogs between the point and wheel dogs, and team dogs are all other dogs in between the wheel and swing dogs and are selected for their endurance, strength, and speed as part of the team. In dog sledding, Siberian Huskies or Alaskan Malamutes are the main types of dogs that are used for recreational sledding because of their strength and speed and endurance as well as their ability to withstand the cold.  However, Alaskan Huskies are also a popular dog for sled dog racing, because of their endurance, good eating habits, speed, and dedication to running even when tired.

Sometimes, for sprint races, mushers use short-haired hounds that are faster than the average husky. These hounds are raised from a young age to pull. It is harder to train hounds than it is to train Siberian Huskies and Malamutes to pull a sled because it is not in their nature.

See also
 Drafting dog
 Dogcart
 Sirius Dog Sled Patrol

References

External links

 The Canadian Museum of Civilization - History of Dogsled mail in the Yukon

Dog sledding
Animal-powered vehicles